Spartan Housing Cooperative (SHC) is a nonprofit member owned and operated housing cooperative.  The SHC was formed as in 1969, as a federation of existing student housing cooperatives in East Lansing.    Since the first of the SHC's member houses formed 69 years ago, SHC has accumulated more than 4,000 members.

Houses
The Spartan Housing Cooperative currently maintains 17 houses in East Lansing, Lansing, and Okemos.

Current Houses
New Community
House of Apollo (previously Avalon)
Beal
The David Bowie Memorial Cooperative
Hedrick
Howland
Toad Lane
Miles Davis 
Orion
Phoenix
Raft Hill
Vesta
Bower
Zolton Ferency
# In 1971, the MSU SHC became a collective land trust with donations of property from Bower, Elsworth, and Hedrick cooperatives.

Houses No Longer A Part of the SHC

Atlantis 
Eleutheria (located at 125 Evergreen Street, it was destroyed by fire in June 1972)
Hillsdale House Cooperative
Montie

A  Chronological History of the SHC Houses

A Brief History of Campus Cooperatives 

Some of the earliest student co-ops in the United States were established around the turn of the century. In Austin, Texas, and in Gainesville, Florida, students began by providing themselves with meal plans. These programs eventually led to early housing co-ops.

These co-ops continued, observing and participating in the rise of the Cooperative League of the USA (CLUSA), and weathering the First World War and the Red Scare of 1919. As the twenties came to an end and the Great Depression set in students, like most people in the US and Canada, were barely able to get by. However, the co-op activist and religious leader Toyohiko Kagawa provided the nation's students with a renewed vision of social and economic cooperation. With the spark of Kagawa's enthusiasm, the 1930s saw the establishment of such long-standing co-ops systems as those in Berkeley, California; Ann Arbor, Michigan; and Toronto, Ontario.

The Second World War slowed much of the momentum of this period; many co-op members were drafted for the war effort. However, the end of the war, with the introduction of the GI Bill, saw new demands for student housing and the establishment of co-op systems in Ithaca, New York; Oberlin, Ohio; and Lincoln, Nebraska.

The late forties also saw the first attempt at a national student co-op organization: the North American Student Cooperative League (NASCL). Although quite successful at first, NASCL lost its major funding source, CLUSA, who cut support in the mid-fifties.

In the sixties, the political fervor over the free speech movement and the antiwar movement brought new enthusiasm to student cooperatives, this time as a social and political alternative to the postindustrial capitalist system. Government support in the form of low-interest housing loans in the US and Canada also contributed to the new boom in student co-ops. In 1968, the new NASCL, the North American Students of Cooperation (NASCO), was formed. Since that time, NASCO has served as the main networking and support system for student co-ops.

See also

North American Students of Cooperation

Notes

References 
"A Chronological History of the MSU SHC Houses", msu.coop.

External links
SHC Homepage
NASCO Homepage

Michigan State University
Student housing cooperatives in the United States
Residential buildings in Michigan